Erigeron maxonii is a Central American species of flowering plant in the family Asteraceae. It has been found only in Panamá and Costa Rica. It is named for the botanist William Ralph Maxon.

Erigeron maxonii is  a perennial subshrub with a woody stem up to 50 cm (20 inches) tall, producing a woody taproot. Stems are sometimes erect (standing straight up), sometimes reclining on the ground or leaning on other vegetation. The plant produces flower heads on long, thin stalks. Each head contains 40-115 white, pink, or red ray florets surrounding numerous yellow disc florets.

References

External links

maxonii
Flora of Panama
Flora of Costa Rica
Plants described in 1924